Paracaeciliidae is a family of bark lice in the order Psocodea (formerly Psocoptera). There are about 5 genera and more than 100 described species in Paracaeciliidae.

Genera
These five genera belong to the family Paracaeciliidae:
 Chilenocaecilius Mockford, 2000
 Enderleinella Badonnel, 1932
 Mockfordiella Badonnel, 1977
 Paracaecilius Badonnel, 1931
 Xanthocaecilius Mockford, 1989

References

Further reading

External links

Caeciliusetae